Savina Yannatou (Greek: Σαβίνα Γιαννάτου, Savína Yannátou; born 16 March 1959, Athens) is a Greek singer.

After taking classical guitar lessons and participating in the children's choir of Yannis Nousias for some years, she studied singing with Gogo Georgilopoulou and Spiros Sakkas in Athens, and later attended postgraduate studies at the Guildhall School of Music and Drama in London. In 1979 she began working as a professional and two years later participated in the recording of the critically acclaimed album Εδώ Λιλιπούπολη ("Lilipoupolis here", that is, "We are broadcasting from Lilipoupolis"); following that, her career took off and has since released numerous albums, collaborating with many Greek composers. In the mid-1990s, she joined forces with select jazz / traditional musicians forming a band known as Primavera en Salonico, which started by interpreting Sephardic and Mediterranean songs, but later expanded to music from various areas of the world. Gradually, she has extended her vocal techniques to include throat singing, glossolalia and ululations among others.

Besides that, her repertoire consists mainly of Greek music, although she has been a founding member of an Early music ensemble (Εργαστήρι Παλιάς Μουσικής), and has always displayed a keen interest in exploring free jazz and avant-garde music. Said explorations have led her to on- and off-stage collaborations and sessions with international musicians such as Barry Guy, Peter Kowald, Floros Floridis, Günther Pitscheider, Gerald Preinfalk of the band BPM, Ken Vandermark, Sussan Deyhim, Damo Suzuki of the krautrock group Can, and Kiya Tabassian of the Ensemble Constantinople.

Yannatou is also a songwriter ("Dreams of the mermaid. Is king Alexander alive?", "Rosa das Rosas", "Musique Des Chambres"), as well as a composer for theatre, dance theatre and video art. She occasionally participates in select workshops, teaching vocal improvisations to actors and musicians. Most all of her early albums were published by Greek music label Lyra. She is from Sumiglia album (2005) on currently an ECM artist.

Discography and participations
Releases (solo/group/compilations):

Compositions for performances

Theatre

Dance theatre

Notes

References

External links
Official Site
Upcoming Concerts from Songkick
Interview for rootsworld.com

1959 births
Living people
Alumni of the Guildhall School of Music and Drama
ECM Records artists
Greek entehno singers
20th-century Greek women singers
21st-century Greek women singers
Judaeo-Spanish-language singers
Singers from Athens